The 1914 Kentucky Wildcats football team represented the University of Kentucky as a member of the Southern Intercollegiate Athletic Association (SIAA) during the 1914 college football season. Led by Alpha Brumage in his second and final season as head coach, the Wildcats compiled an overall record of 5–3 with a mark 1–1 in SIAA play.

Schedule

References

Kentucky
Kentucky Wildcats football seasons
Kentucky Wildcats football